Rebekah Chamblit (1706–1733) lived in Boston, Massachusetts in the 18th century. She was tried and executed in 1733 for infanticide.

When she was 26 years old, the unmarried Chamblit became pregnant. In May, 1733, she gave birth to what was probably a stillborn. By her own account:  "On Saturday the fifth day of May last, being then something more than eight months gone with child, as I was about my household business reaching some sand from out of a large cask, I received considerable hurt, which put me into great pain, and so I continued till the Tuesday following; in all which time I am not sensible I felt any life or motion in the child within me; when, on the ... Tuesday of the eighth day of may, I was delivered when alone of a male infant; in whom I did not perceive life...."

At length the situation was brought before a jury, "who brought in their verdict, Guilty.  Accordingly ... the poor woman received Sentence of Death."  Her "declaration," "read at the place of execution," September 26, 1733, may not have been in fact written by Chamblit herself; scholars suggest the text represents a forced confession.

References

Further reading
Records of the Superior Court of Judicature. Massachusetts State Archives, Boston. 1733; Reel 134, vol. 251, #35693. (Cited in Harris, 1999; p. 92).
Thomas Foxcroft, Lessons of caution to young sinners. A sermon preach'd on Lord's-Day Sept. 23. 1733. Upon the affecting occasion of an unhappy young woman present in the assembly under sentence of death, 1733.
Sharon M. Harris, "Feminist Theories and Early American Studies," Early American Literature, Vol. 34, No. 1 (1999), pp. 86–93.

External links
WorldCat

People from colonial Boston
People executed by the Kingdom of Great Britain
People executed for murder
18th century in Boston
18th-century American people
1706 births
1733 deaths
People of colonial Massachusetts